Pieter Nys (born 13 July 1989) is a Belgian former professional footballer who played as a defensive midfielder. During his career he played for Genk, Fortuna Sittard, OH Leuven and Sparta Rotterdam.

References

External links
 
 

1989 births
Living people
Belgian footballers
Association football defenders
Eerste Divisie players
Belgian Pro League players
Challenger Pro League players
K.R.C. Genk players
Fortuna Sittard players
Oud-Heverlee Leuven players
Sparta Rotterdam players
MVV Maastricht players
Belgian expatriate footballers
Expatriate footballers in the Netherlands
Belgian expatriate sportspeople in the Netherlands
Sportspeople from Hasselt
Footballers from Limburg (Belgium)
Association football midfielders